Utair operates flights to the following scheduled year-round and seasonal destinations:

Destinations

References

Utair